The 2011 All-Ireland Minor Hurling Championship was the 81st staging of the All-Ireland Minor Hurling Championship since its establishment by the Gaelic Athletic Association in 1928. The championship began on 9 April 2011 and ended on 4 September 2011.

Kilkenny entered the championship as the defending champions, however, they were beaten by Waterford in the All-Ireland quarter-final.

On 4 September 2011, Galway won the championship after a 1-21 to 1-12 defeat of Dublin in the All-Ireland final at Croke Park. This was their 9th championship title overall and their first title since 2009.

Armagh's Mattie Lennon was the championship's top scorer with 4-25.

Results

Leinster Minor Hurling Championship

Preliminary round

First round

Second round

Third round

Semi-finals

Final

Munster Minor Hurling Championship

Quarter-finals

Playoffs

Semi-finals

Final

Ulster Minor Hurling Championship

First round

Quarter-finals

Semi-final

Final

All-Ireland Minor Hurling Championship

Quarter-finals

Semi-finals

Final

Championship statistics

Top scorers

Top scorers overall

Top scorers in a single game

References

External links
 Full list of results for the 2011 championship

Minor
All-Ireland Minor Hurling Championship